The Division of Batman was an Australian Electoral Division in the state of Victoria. It took its name from John Batman, one of the founders of the city of Melbourne. The division was created in 1906, replacing the Division of Northern Melbourne, and was abolished in 2019 and replaced by the Division of Cooper.

The division was located in Melbourne's northern suburbs.

Held by Labor for all but 10 years of its history, Batman has traditionally been a safe Labor seat. However, the Greens have made the seat a contest since 2010, where they reduced Labor from a 26.0% margin to a 7.9% margin. Though Labor increased their margin against the Greens to 10.6% in 2013, the Greens reduced Labor's margin to just 1.0% in 2016. At the 2018 Batman by-election however, Labor increased their margin to 4.4% against the Greens.

In June 2018, the Australian Electoral Commission announced that, at the 2019 Australian federal election, the division would be re-named Cooper, after Aboriginal community leader and activist William Cooper.

History

When it was created it covered the inner suburbs of Carlton and Fitzroy, but successive boundary changes have moved it steadily northwards. Today it includes Northcote, Preston, Reservoir and Thornbury.

Located in Labor's traditional heartland of north Melbourne, Batman has been in Labor hands for all but two terms since 1910, and without interruption since 1969. It has been held by senior Labor figures since 1977. It was held by Brian Howe from 1977 to 1996, a senior minister in the Hawke and Keating governments, and also Deputy Prime Minister 1991–95. Howe was succeeded at the 1996 election by Martin Ferguson, moving to Parliament after six years as President of the ACTU. Ferguson served as a senior Labor frontbencher, and a minister in the Rudd and Gillard governments, before resigning from the ministry in March 2013 after the failed challenge to Gillard's leadership.  He was succeeded at the 2013 election by former Senator David Feeney, who had been a parliamentary secretary in the Rudd and Gillard governments.

In 2018, as a result of the 2017–18 Australian parliamentary eligibility crisis, Feeney resigned and decided not to seek pre-selection to run at the ensuing by-election. The 2018 Batman by-election held on 17 March saw the election of Labor's Ged Kearney.

Members

Election results

References

External links
 Division of Batman – Australian Electoral Commission

Former electoral divisions of Australia
Constituencies established in 1906
Constituencies disestablished in 2019
1906 establishments in Australia